Sohrevard (also Romanized as Sohravard) is a city in the Central District of Khodabandeh County, Zanjan province, Iran. At the 2006 census, its population was 5,786 in 1,356 households, when it was a village. The following census in 2011 counted 6,104 people in 1,665 households, by which time the village had been elevated to the status of a city. The latest census in 2016 showed a population of 6,991 people in 1,961 households.

Sohrevard was the birthplace of the 12th-century Iranian philosopher, Shahab al-Din Suhrawardi, the Persian Sufi Abu al-Najib Suhrawardi and his nephew Shahab al-Din Abu Hafs Umar Suhrawardi (a direct descendant of Islamic Khalifa Abū Bakr as-Ṣiddīq).

Etymology 
According to Theodor Nöldeke, and later followed by Josef Marquart, the name Sohrevard was originally derived from the personal name Sohrab, so that the city's original name would have been something like Suxrāp-kart or Suhrāv-gerd. Nöldeke specifically thought the Sohrab in question was a certain governor of al-Hirah attested with this name, but there were many other known people named Sohrab and in reality the city could have been named after any one of them.

History 
Medieval Muslim geographers described Sohrevard as a town in the province of Jibal, located south of Soltaniyeh on the road from Hamadan to Zanjan. According to al-Istakhri, this route was the shortest route to get from Jibal to Adharbayjan and was the one usually used in peacetime; in times of political conflict, travellers took the longer route via Qazvin instead. Ibn Hawqal wrote the exact opposite about the two routes. Since Sohrevard had a cold highland climate, it did not produce much agriculturally except for grain and some smaller fruits.

In the 10th century, when Ibn Hawqal wrote, Sohrevard was a Kurdish town inhabited by Kharijites, who later mostly emigrated from the city. The walled city of Sohrevard was later destroyed by the Mongols. In the 14th century, Hamdallah Mustawfi described Sohrevard as merely a small village, with many Mongol villages also in the area.

References 

Khodabandeh County

Cities in Zanjan Province

Populated places in Zanjan Province

Populated places in Khodabandeh County